The  opened in Sekigahara, Gifu Prefecture, Japan in 2020. It tells the story of the 1600 Battle of Sekigahara and promotes the "charm and fascination" of the battlefield, which has been designated a national Historic Site. The  opened in an adjacent facility on the same day.

See also
 List of Historic Sites of Japan (Gifu)
 Gifu Prefectural Museum
 Sengoku period
 Tokugawa shogunate

References

External links
 Gifu Sekigahara Battlefield Memorial Museum

Sekigahara, Gifu
Museums in Gifu Prefecture
Museums established in 2020
2020 establishments in Japan
Military and war museums in Japan
History museums in Japan